The following is a timeline of the history of the city of Mesa, Arizona, United States.

Prior to 20th century
 1878 – Mormon settlers arrive.
 1883
 Mesa City incorporated.  The townsite's bounded by Broadway Road on the south, Mesa Drive on the east, University Drive on the north, & Country Club Drive on the west.
 Alexander Findlay Macdonald becomes mayor.
 1892 – Mesa Free Press newspaper begins publication.
 1896 – Sirrine House built.

20th century

1900s–1960s
 1902 – Evans School for Boys opens; later renamed Mesa Ranch School
 1908 – Granite Reef Diversion Dam is completed; the Salt River Valley Water Users' Association permanently provides water for irrigation canals in Mesa from this point, replacing the earlier Mormon-lead efforts
 1909 – The original "Old Main" campus of Mesa High School opens
 Mesa installs potable waterworks system
 1911 – Roosevelt Dam is completed, regulating the flow of the Salt River for the first time, and providing cheap electrical power to parts of Mesa
 Mesa takes over irrigation system operation within incorporated city limits
 1915 – Mesa installs sanitary sewer system and septic tank tract at Riverview
 1917 – Mesa purchases existing gas and electric utilities from Dr. A.J. Chandler
 1921 – Mesa Welfare League founded.
 1923 – Mesa Tribune newspaper begins publication.
 1927 – Mesa Arizona Temple dedicated (first time).
 1928 – first production of the Mesa Arizona Easter Pageant
 1931 – Town area expanded.
 1937 – City Hall built.
 1941
 U.S. Williams Air Force Base established.
 British Flying Training School at Falcon Field active near Mesa
 1948
 Mesa Country Club established.
 Falcon Field becomes part of Mesa
 1949 – Modern wastewater treatment plant built at Riverview
 1950
 KTYL-FM radio begins broadcasting.
 Population: 16,790.
 1953 – General Motors Desert Proving Grounds opens
 KTYL-TV (channel 12; the current day KPNX) launches. The NBC affiliate continues to be licensed to Mesa, but operates from Phoenix
 Mesa celebrates 75th anniversary Diamond Jubilee
 10 million gallon Pasadena city reservoir completed
 1962 – Westwood High School opens
 1965 – Mesa Community College, and Adelante con Mesa established.
 1967
 Regional Maricopa Association of Governments established.
 Original "Old Main" building of Mesa High School burns to the ground
 1968
 Tri City Mall in business.
 KMND radio begins broadcasting.
 City of Mesa takes over operations of Falcon Field

1970s–1990s
 1970
 Lehi becomes part of city.
 Population: 63,049.
 1971 – Prehab of Mesa (youth-related nonprofit) established.
 1972 – Mesa High School reopens at a new location (farther east and south)
 1972 – Mesa Central High School opens at site of original Mesa High campus
 1973 – Dobson Ranch planned community began selling homes in the first phase of its 26-year development
 1975
 After extensive renovations, the Mesa Arizona Temple is rededicated
 The Park of the Canals is added to the National Register of Historic Places; work then commences for developing park facilities and later the botanical garden
 1976 – Mountain View High School opens
 1977
 Mesa Southwest Museum (later renamed the Arizona Museum of Natural History) founded
 the original Hohokam Park opens
 1978 – Western Design Center is founded by Bill Mensch
 Mesa celebrates 100-year Centennial
 1979
 Fiesta Mall in business.
 Mesa Amphitheatre built.
 Mesa Weekly News begins publication.
 1980
 Population: 152,453.
 Arizona Museum for Youth opens
 Used Cars, filmed primarily in Mesa, opens in theaters
 1981
 Dobson High School opens
 Mesa Sister Cities Association and Mesa United Way active.
 Sister city relationship established with Guaymas, Mexico.
 Champlin Fighter Museum opens
 1983
 Sister city relationship established with Upper Hutt, New Zealand.
 Mesa Golfland opens, expanding to become Golfland Sunsplash by 1986
 1984 – Al Brooks becomes mayor.
 1987
 Mesa Historical Museum opens
 Living Word Bible Church active.
 1988
 Peggy Rubach becomes mayor.
 Red Mountain High School opens
 1989 – Sister city relationship established with Caraz, Peru.
 1990
 Population: 288,091.
 Superstition Springs Center opens
 first section of Arizona State Route 202 opens; downtown Lehi was removed to make way for it
 1991
 East Valley Institute of Technology Main campus opens
 Mesa Community Action Network active.
 1992
 Willie Wong becomes mayor.
 Mesa Solar Sox is founded
 1993
 Sister city relationship established with Kaiping, China.
 Williams Air Force Base closes, begins transition to Williams Gateway Airport
 1994
 Williams Gateway Airport opens
 Paz De Cristo Community Center opens
 1995
 A.T. Still University's Arizona School of Health Sciences opens
 Heritage Academy (Arizona) opens
 the current Organ Stop Pizza location in Mesa is opened
 1996
 City website online.
 Wayne Brown becomes mayor.
 Arizona State University at the Polytechnic campus opens on the former Williams Air Force Base
 Sun Valley High School opens
 1997
 Harkins Superstition Springs cinema in business.
 Noah Webster School opens.
 the new HoHoKam Stadium opens
 1998 – Tri City Mall closes, all existing buildings demolished except for former site of JCPenney store, which remains standing until 2006
 1999
 Skyline High School opens
 AMC Mesa Grand 24 cinema in business.
 Saint Ignatius of Antioch Church active (approximate date).
 Sister city relationship established with Burnaby, Canada.
 2000
 Keno Hawker becomes mayor.
 Population: 396,375.

21st century
 2002 – Desert Ridge High School opens; it is physically located in Mesa, but is part of Gilbert Public Schools instead of Mesa Public Schools.
 2003
 Arizona School of Dentistry and Oral Health opens at A.T. Still University's Mesa campus
 Champlin Fighter Museum closed
 2005
 Mesa Arts Center built.
 Mesa Miners is founded
 Mesa adopts city flag
 2006 – Mesa Preparatory Academy opens
 2007
 Mesa Riverview opens
 Gateway 12/IMAX Theatre (cinema) in business.
 A.T. Still University School of Osteopathic Medicine in Arizona opens at A.T. Still University's Mesa campus
 2008
 October: Immigration raid by Maricopa County Sheriff.
 Sycamore Drive and Main Street Valley Metro Rail station opens, in front of the former Tri City Mall location; it is the first Metro Light Rail station in Mesa, and is the eastern terminator until future expansions are completed
 Scott Smith becomes mayor.
 2009
 closure of the General Motors Desert Proving Grounds is completed
 East Valley Mormon Choral Organization established, as part of the Millennial Choirs and Orchestras
 2010
 United Food Bank active.
 Population: city 439,041; metro 4,192,887.
 2011
 East Valley Institute of Technology  East campus opened, adjacent to ASU Polytechnic
 Humanist Society of Greater Phoenix active.
 2012
 February 22: Republican Party presidential primaries debate held.
 December 10: Alexander murder trial begins.
 2013
 Mesa Grande Cultural Park opens.
 Matt Salmon becomes U.S. representative for Arizona's 5th congressional district and Kyrsten Sinema becomes U.S. representative for Arizona's 9th congressional district.
 the inaugural Visit Mesa Gateway Classic annual golf tournament is held
 2014
 Cubs Park opens

See also
 History of Mesa, Arizona
 List of Mayors of Mesa, Arizona
 Timeline of Arizona
 Timelines of other cities in Arizona: Phoenix, Tucson

References

Bibliography

External links

 
 Arizona Archives Online. Materials related to Mesa, various dates
 Digital Public Library of America. Items related to Mesa, Arizona, various dates
 Library of Congress, Prints & Photos Division. Materials related to Mesa, Arizona, various dates
 Heritage Wall, Arizona Museum of Natural History

Years in Arizona
mesa
mesa